Events in the year 1908 in Spain.

Incumbents
National level
 Monarch: Alfonso XIII
 President of the Council of Ministers: Antonio Maura
 Minister of Foreign Affairs: Manuel Allendesalazar 
 Minister of Justice: Juan Armada Losada
 Minister of War: Fernando Primo de Rivera
 Minister of Finance: Guillermo de Osma y Scull, Cayetano Sánchez Bustillo and Augusto González Besada
 Minister of the Navy: José Ferrándiz y Niño
 Ministro de Gobernación: Juan de la Cierva y Peñafiel
 Minister of Public Instruction: Faustino Rodríguez San Pedro
 Minister of Public Works: Augusto González Besada and José Sánchez Guerra

Cities
 Mayor of Madrid: 
 Mayor of Barcelona:  and

Events 
 May - The Hispano-French Exposition of 1908 opens in Zaragoza, marking the hundredth anniversary of the  first siege of Zaragoza.

Arts

Films
El hotel eléctrico, directed by Segundo de Chomón

Literature
Vicente Blasco Ibáñez - Blood and Sand (Sangre y arena)
José Toribio Medina - Los Restos Indígenas de Pichilemu

Births
22 October - José Escobar Saliente, comic book writer and artist (died 1994)
8 December - Concha Piquer, singer and actress (died 1990)
11 December - Carlos Arias Navarro, politician (died 1989)
date unknown - Miguel García, anarchist (died 1981)

Deaths
20 June - Federico Chueca, composer (born 1846)
20 September - Pablo de Sarasate, violinist and composer (born 1844)

References

 
Years of the 20th century in Spain
1900s in Spain
Spain
Spain